The Hulftsdorp court complex is a large courthouse complex in Colombo, Sri Lanka, housing various courts of the country's judicial system. The complex is situated in a short hill known as Hulftsdorp from which it derives its name. With origins dating back to the Dutch colonial era, the current complex was built during the British colonial era. Currently two Special High Courts, eight High Courts, three Commercial High Courts, and eight District Courts are housed in court complex in a collection of colonial buildings.

References

Judiciary of Sri Lanka
Buildings and structures in Colombo
Government buildings in Colombo